Victor Robert may refer to:

 Victor Robert (politician) (1822–1885), Canadian politician
 Victor Robert (sport shooter) (1863–?), Belgian sport shooter and Olympian